The 1986 PBA season was the 12th season of the Philippine Basketball Association (PBA).

Board of governors

Executive committee
 Mariano A. Yenko, Jr. (Commissioner) 
 Rodriguo Salud (Deputy Commissioner)
 Carlos Palanca III  (Chairman, representing Ginebra San Miguel)
 Reynaldo Marquez (Vice Chairman, representing Pilipinas Shell Oilers)
 Andrew H. Jao (Treasurer, representing Manila Beer Brewmasters)

Teams

Season highlights
Due to the aftermath of the 1986 People Power Revolution, the uncertainty of opening a new PBA season became imminent after two teams that have connections with the Marcoses (Tanduay and Manila Beer) were unsure if they will still continue in taking part of the league. Likewise, it was then not known who will be in charge of the PBA's main venue, the ULTRA and Vintage Sports TV network partner Maharlika Broadcasting System. The league eventually opened its season at The ULTRA on April 6 and was aired on MBS. MBS will be later renamed as the People's Television Network the same year.
PBA legal counsel Atty. Rudy Salud was appointed as deputy commissioner after Tommy Manotoc resigned.
The Alaska Milkmen became the newest team that joined the league while the Magnolia ballclub, one of the founding members of the PBA, took a temporary leave of absence. Magnolia makes its comeback in the Third Conference with a new lineup composed of 10 rookies, eight of which were former national players from the disbanded Northern Consolidated (NCC) team.
The board of governors approved an amendment to the PBA constitution that replaces the position of the PBA President into the Chairman of the Board of Governors.
Teams paraded two reinforcements each in the import-laden conferences, which led to a record-breaking success by the league on the last term of PBA chairman Carlos "Honeyboy" Palanca.
The birth of the most bitter PBA rivalry since the Toyota-Crispa days - that between the Tanduay Rhum Makers and crowd-favorite Ginebra San Miguel - with both teams winning their first championship during the season.

Opening ceremonies
The muses for the participating teams are as follows:

Champions
 Reinforced Conference: Tanduay Rhum Makers
 All-Filipino Conference: Tanduay Rhum Makers
 Open Conference: Ginebra San Miguel
 Team with best win–loss percentage: Ginebra San Miguel (42-23, .647)
 Best Team of the Year: Tanduay Rhum Makers (1st & Final)

Reinforced Conference

Elimination round

Semifinal round

Third place playoffs 

|}

Finals

|}
Best Import of the Conference: Rob Williams (Tanduay)

All-Filipino Conference

Elimination round

Quarterfinal round

Semifinal round

Third place playoffs 

|}

Finals

|}

Open Conference

Elimination round

Quarterfinal round

Semifinal round

Third place playoffs 

|}

Finals

|}
Best Import of the Conference: Michael Young (Manila Beer)

Awards
 Most Valuable Player: Ramon Fernandez (Tanduay)
 Rookie of the Year:  Dondon Ampalayo (Ginebra)
 Most Improved Player: Ricky Relosa (Alaska)
 Best Import-Reinforced Conference: Rob Williams (Tanduay)
 Best Import-Open Conference: Michael Young (Manila Beer)
 Mythical Five:
Ricardo Brown (Great Taste)
Robert Jaworski (Ginebra)
Ramon Fernandez (Tanduay)
Manny Victorino (Great Taste)
Freddie Hubalde (Tanduay)
 Mythical Second Team:
Chito Loyzaga (Ginebra)
Padim Israel (Tanduay)
Terry Saldaña (Ginebra)
JB Yango (Tanduay)
Dondon Ampalayo (Ginebra)
 All-Defensive Team:
Chito Loyzaga (Ginebra)
Philip Cezar (Shell)
Elpidio Villamin (Manila Beer)
Ricky Relosa (Alaska)
Padim Israel (Tanduay)

Cumulative standings

References